Ya nunca más is a 1983 Mexican musical film directed by Abel Salazar. It starred the young Luis Miguel in his first film role as a soccer-loving youngster who after breaking his leg, is diagnosed with leukemia and has to cope with the amputation of that leg. The soundtrack album Ya nunca más became Miguel's first gold record.

Cast 
 Luis Miguel – Luis Aranda
 Gonzalo Vega – Enrique Aranda
 Rosa Salazar Arenas – Lorena
 Ariadna Welter – Sra. Cecilia
Sergio Kleiner – Doctor

References 

1984 films
Mexican musical films
1980s Mexican films